Pollenza is a comune (municipality) in the Province of Macerata in the Italian region Marche, located about  southwest of Ancona and about  southwest of Macerata.

Among the religious buildings in town are:
San Giuseppe: Baroque style church.
Sant'Andrea Apostolo
Abbazia di Rambona: remains of a Benedictine abbey, mainly the Church of Santa Maria Assunta, are located a few kilometers west of the town.
San Biagio, Pollenza

Pollenza borders the following municipalities: Macerata, San Severino Marche, Tolentino, Treia.

Culture 
Pollenza has a charming Theater built in 1883, named after the Italian composer Giuseppe Verdi.

Demographic evolution

References

External links
 www.pollenza.sinp.net/

Cities and towns in the Marche